Mel Silver may refer to: 

Mel Silver (Waking The Dead), a character on the TV show Waking the Dead
Mel Silver, a character on Beverly Hills, 90210